Open Journal Systems, also known as OJS, is an open source and free software for the management of peer-reviewed academic journals, created by the Public Knowledge Project, and released under the GNU General Public License.

History
Open Journal Systems (OJS) was conceived to facilitate the development of open access, peer-reviewed publishing, providing the technical infrastructure for the presentation of journal articles along with an editorial-management workflow, including article submission, peer-review, and indexing. OJS relies upon individuals fulfilling different roles, such as journal manager, editor, reviewer, author, and reader. It has a module that supports subscription journals.

Like other community-based projects such as WordPress, the software has a plugin architecture, which allows new features to be integrated without changing its core codebase. Available plugins facilitate indexing in Google Scholar and PubMed Central, publishing RSS/Atom web syndication feeds, and providing COUNTER statistics about online usage, several plugins are curated and directly available for download through its plugin gallery interface. OJS is also LOCKSS-compliant, which helps ensure ongoing access to journal contents. Third-party plugins include Reading Tools, which point readers to related studies, media stories, and policy documents in open access databases, the Better Password plugin, which forces the users to use strong passwords, and many others freely available in GitHub. OJS also provides custom themes, which might be added to the installation through its plugin gallery and a demo installation to experiment its features.

Versions
OJS is currently in its 3.3.0-14 version, released in February 2023, and its first version was originally released in 2001. The software possesses an open well defined development roadmap and a set of milestones.

The software is written in PHP, currently supports two databases, MySQL/MariaDB and PostgreSQL, and can be hosted on a Unix-like or Windows web server.

Note: OJS 2 has reached its end of life in 2021, its latest release was the version 2.4.8-5, released in May 2019. When upgrading from the version 2.x to 3.x, some care must be taken given that several features have been added and removed, especially if the installation has hand-made customizations.

Translations
As of version 3.3.0, the software has been translated into 50 languages: Arabic, Armenian, Basque, Belarusian, Bosnian, Bulgarian, Catalan, Chinese, Chinese, Croatian, Czech, Danish, Dutch, English, Finnish, French, Gaelic, Galician, Georgian, German, Greek, Hebrew, Hindi, Hungarian, Indonesian, Italian, Japanese, Kazakh, Kurdish, Macedonian, Malay, Norwegian, Persian, Polish, Portuguese, Romanian, Russian, Serbian, Slovak, Slovenian, Spanish, Swedish, Turkish, Ukrainian, and Vietnamese, with many additional languages (including Uzbek, Urdu, Sinhala, Lithuanian, Korean, and Mongolian) in development. Translations are created and maintained by the user community.

Documentation
PKP keeps an extensive documentation hub where users can find documentation about all of its systems. The documentation covers basic software usage, migration instructions, development practices, accessibility, video tutorials and the content has been translated partially into other languages.

Usage

A growing body of publications and documentation is available on the project's website.

As of mid-2021, OJS was being used by at least 25,000 journals worldwide. A daily updated map showing the location of these journals is also available on PKP's website. A survey in 2010 found that about half were in the developing world.

The Public Knowledge Project is also collaborating with the International Network for the Availability of Scientific Publications (INASP) to develop scholarly research portals in Africa, Bangladesh, Nepal, and Vietnam.
In Venezuela, at least 32 independent organizations, public and private universities publish 230 journals using this platform.

OJS, as well as the Érudit publishing system, is being used in the Synergies project, creating a scholarly portal for Canadian social sciences and humanities research. OJS is also being used for research portals in Brazil, Spain, Italy, and Greece.

Hosting

OJS hosting service is offered for a fee by the PKP|Publishing Services (PKP-operated Publishing Services), as well as a variety of third-party commercial and non-commercial service providers not affiliated with PKP.

PKP has also released a Docker container in GitHub, which may be helpful to spin-up an OJS instance without having to deal with the web server, database and PHP installation. The container is still in beta, so it should be used only for testing purposes.

See also 
 Open access journal
 DPubS
 OpenACS

Further reading
da Fonseca, R.M.S. (2004, June). Open Journal Systems. Paper presented at the ICCC 8th International Conference on Electronic Publishing, Brasilia.
Muthayan, S. (2003). Open access research and the public domain in South African universities: The Public Knowledge Project's Open Journal Systems. Paper presented at the International Symposium on Open Access and the Public Domain in Digital Data and Information for Science, UNESCO, Paris.
Willinsky, J. (2005). Open Journal Systems: An example of open source software for journal management and publishing. Library Hi-Tech 23 (4), 504–519.
A Survey and Evaluation of Open-Source Electronic Publishing Systems, Mark Cyzyk and Sayeed Choudhury, Johns Hopkins University

References

External links 
 

Free software programmed in PHP
2001 software
Publication management software
Open access (publishing)